Trade literature is a general term including advertising, customer technical communications, and catalogues.

Trade journal

A trade magazine, or trade rag, also called a professional magazine, is a magazine published with the intention of target marketing to a specific industry or type of trade. The collective term for this area of publishing is the trade press.
Trade magazines typically contain advertising content centered on the industry in question with little if any general-audience advertising.

Trade catalog
Definitions of the term "trade catalog" vary, but originally, trade catalogs are printed materials published by manufacturing, wholesaling, or retailing firms. They promote sales by making advertising claims, give instructions in using products, provide testimonials from satisfied customers, and include detailed descriptions of sale products.

Trade catalogs first appeared in the 18th century, with the expansion in trade, commerce and consumption. The distinguished English cabinet maker, Thomas Chippendale published a book of his designs in 1754, entitled The Gentleman and Cabinet Maker's Director and regarded as the "first comprehensive trade catalogue of its kind". The designs were regarded as reflecting the current London fashion for furniture, and set the standard for his competitors in the market. Chippendale followed this up with a virtual reprint in 1755, and finally a revised and enlarged edition in 1762.

“Trade catalog” derives from the expression “to the trade,” and the materials were originally produced by manufacturers and wholesalers for their salesmen to market to retailers. The Trade Literature Collection is internationally known as an extraordinary source for the history of American business, technology, marketing, consumption, and design. Trade literature includes printed or handwritten documents, usually illustrated, of items offered for sale, ranging in size from small pamphlets to oversized folios of several hundred pages.

Nowadays, trade catalogs are fully digitized like the open catalogue project Open Icecat.

Collections

 Ball State University Digital Media Repository
 Architectural Trade Catalogs collection
 Caroline Simpson Library & Research Collection, Sydney Living Museums
 A World of Designs
 Digitised Trade Catalogues
 Caroline Simpson Library & Research Collection
 Digital Collections from The Metropolitan Museum of Art Libraries
 Trade Catalogs collection
 Hagley Museum and Library
 Digitized trade catalogs
 Science Museum Library & Archives (Wroughton)
 Trade Literature Collection
 Smithsonian Institution Libraries
 Historical Seed Nursery Catalogues 
 Instruments for Science, 1800-1914: Scientific Trade Catalogs in Smithsonian Collections 
 Sewing Machines, Historical Trade Literature
 State Technical Library. Prague, Czech Republic
 Trade Literature Collection
 The Henry Ford - Benson Ford Research Center
 Research Library - Includes over 30,000 trade literature items representing all types of manufactured goods from automobiles to household goods and more.
University of California, Santa Barbara
Romaine Trade Catalog Collection
Victoria and Albert Museum
 Trade Literature Collection in the National Art Library

Exhibitions
 Smithsonian Institution
 Doodles, Drafts and Designs: Industrial Drawings from the Smithsonian (2004)

References

Bibliography
Ames, Kenneth L., "Trade catalogues and the study of history," in Accumulation & display: mass marketing household goods in America, 1880-1920. Winterthur, Del.: Henry Francis du Pont Winterthur Museum, 1986. pp. 7–14

Baker, T. Lindsay. North American Windmill Manufacturers' Trade Literature (Norman, Ok: University of Oklahoma Press, 1998)

Baker, T. Lindsay, "Researching history through trade literature," History News, vol. 53, no. 1 (Winter, 1998), pp. 24–27

Crom, Theodore R. Trade Catalogues, 1542-1842. Melrose, Fla.: T.R. Crom, 1989.

Culbertson, Margaret, "Mail-order architecture: Plan books and American house design," in Consumer culture and the American home, 1890-1930 (Beaumont, TX: McFaddin-Ward House, 1988); pp. 65–69

Davis, Audrey B. The finest instruments ever made: a bibliography of medical, dental, optical, and pharmaceutical company trade literature, 1700-1939 (Arlington, Mass.: Medical History Pub. Associates, c1986)

Gitner, Fred (compiled and edited by) Medical trade catalogs at The New York Academy of Medicine Library: a bibliography / (New York, NY: The New York Academy of Medicine, 1995)

Gottfried, Herbert. "Building the picture: trading on the imagery of production and design," Winterthur Portfolio, vol. 27 no.4 (1992) pp. 235–253.

Hagley Museum and Library. Trade catalogs in the Hagley Museum and Library by Nina de Angeli Walls. (Wilmington, Del.: Hagley Museum and Library, 1987)

Jennings, Jan. "Drawing on the vernacular interior," Winterthur Portfolio, vol. 27 no. 4 (1992) pp. 255–279

Kernan, Michael, "Generations of old mail-order catalogs make colorful index to what folks prized and paid for, way back when," Smithsonian vol. 22 (April 1991), pp. 32–33

Kurutz, Gary F., "California commercial catalogs: from hosiery to hardware on exhibit," California State Library Foundation Bulletin, no. 56, (July, 1996) pp. 15–28

Laird, Pamela Walker. Advertising Progress: American Business and the Rise of Consumer Marketing. (Baltimore: Johns Hopkins University Press, 1998)

Lears, Jackson. Fables of Abundance: A cultural history of advertising in America (New York: Basic Books, 1994)

MacLean, Jayne T., "Nursery and seed trade catalogs," Journal of NAL Associates 5(3-4) (1980) pp. 88–92.

McKinstry, E. Richard. Trade catalogues at Winterthur: a guide to the literature of merchandising, 1750-1980. (New York: Garland Publishing, 1984)

McMurray, Elizabeth. At home in the thirties: the EKCO Collection of trade catalogues. London: National Art Library, Victoria & Albert Museum, 1995. [Exhibition catalogue]

Mount, Ellis (ed.) The role of trade literature in sci-tech libraries. (New York: Haworth Press, 1990)

Norris, James D. Advertising and the Transformation of American Society, 1865-1920. (New York: Greenwood Press, 1990).

Ratner, Rhoda. "Historical research in trade catalogs," Science & Technology Libraries, vol. 10 (Summer, 1990); pp. 15–22

Reiff, Daniel D. Houses from books: treatise, pattern books, and catalogs in American architecture, 1738-1950: a history and guide (University Park, Pa.: Pennsylvania State University Press, 2000)

Romaine, Lawrence B. A guide to American trade catalogues, 1744-1900. (New York: Dover, 1990)

Schlereth, Thomas, "Country stores, county fairs, and mail order catalogs: consumerism in rural America," in Consumer culture and the American Home, 1890-1930 (Beaumont, TX: McFaddin-Ward House, 1989); pp. 27–45

Smith, Gaye. Trade Catalogues: A Hundred Years, 1850-1949. (Manchester: Manchester Metropolitan University Library, 1992)

Thompson, Neville, "Trade catalogues in the Winterthur Library," Magazine Antiques, vol. 161, no.1 (January, 2002); pp. 206–211

Travers, Irene L., "Trade literature at the National Museum of History and Technology [currently the National Museum of American History]" Special Libraries, vol. 70, no. 7 (1979) pp. 272–280

Williams, Chauncey L. The dual role of manufacturers' catalogs in industrial marketing (New York: Sweet's Catalog Service, [1940?])

Promotion and marketing communications